Boris Tyutyukov (Bulgarian: Борис Тютюков; born 28 October 1997) is a Bulgarian footballer who plays as a midfielder for Pirin Blagoevgrad.

Career
Tyutyukov made his A Group debut on 6 March 2016, when he came on as a substitute during the 1–1 away draw against Beroe Stara Zagora. A week later, on 13 March, he came on a substitute during the 3-1 win over Cherno more Varna.

On 29 April Tyutyukov was included in the starting lineup for the 2-2 draw with PFC Pirin Blagoevgrad. Unfortunately, he performed below expectations and was replaced in the 26th minute.

Tyutyukov left Botev Plovdiv in June 2017.
In July 2017, he joined Pomorie.

References

External links
 

1997 births
Living people
Bulgarian footballers
Botev Plovdiv players
FC Vitosha Bistritsa players
FC Pomorie players
FC CSKA 1948 Sofia players
PFC Litex Lovech players
First Professional Football League (Bulgaria) players
Second Professional Football League (Bulgaria) players
Association football midfielders
Footballers from Sofia